Kenneth Paul Karcher (born July 1, 1963) is an American football coach and former player. He is currently the head football coach at East Central Community College, a position he has held since January 2013. Karcher served in the same capacity at Liberty University from 2000 to 2005, compiling a record of 21–46.

Early life and playing career
Out of Shaler Area High School, in Pennsylvania, Karcher was a highly recruited quarterback and eventually went to the University of Notre Dame. While there, he was a third-string quarterback behind Blair Kiel. He decided to transfer after two years to Tulane University, where he finished out his collegiate playing career.

Karcher went undrafted by NFL teams, and bounced around training camps before going to the Denver Broncos. He played in a total of four NFL games; three of those games came when he played as a replacement player while many other NFL players were on strike. The Broncos retained him for the rest of the year, and Karcher backed up John Elway while the team played in Super Bowl XXII. Karcher continued to play for the Broncos for one additional season, in 1988.

Coaching career
Karcher began his coaching career in 1991 as an assistant coach at the University of North Texas, where he coached the Mean Green quarterbacks and receivers. The next year, he was hired by head coach Galen Hall as the passing game coordinator and quarterbacks coach for the Orlando Thunder of the World League of American Football. Following the suspension of the World League, Karcher returned to the college ranks as an assistant on Johnny Majors' coaching staff at the University of Pittsburgh. During his first season, he served as the Panthers' pass offense coordinator and quarterbacks coach, sharing coordinator duties with run offense coordinator Charles Coe. In March 1994, Majors put Karcher in sole charge of the offense, promoting him to offensive coordinator and quarterbacks coach. He held that position for the next three years, until Majors resignation at the end of the 1996 season.

In 1997, Karcher rejoined Galen Hall in the revamped World League, this time as the offensive coordinator and quarterbacks coach of the Rhein Fire, based in Düsseldorf, Germany. He helped lead the Fire to the first winning season in the team's three-year history. Rhein finished in first place with a record of 7–3, but lost to the Barcelona Dragons in World Bowl '97. Under his tutelage, quarterback T. J. Rubley earned all-World League honors and was named the league's offensive most valuable player. Karcher's offense led the league in rushing yards (1,555) and ranked second in total offense (3,253). The offensive line set a league record by holding their opponents to only one sack the entire regular season.

College coaching
Karcher was named the sixth head football coach at Liberty University on February 18, 2000.

At Liberty, Karcher's teams underachieved. Despite this, Liberty chancellor Jerry Falwell resigned him to a 5-year contract after the 2004 season.  But, he would only last one more season.  After a 1–10 campaign in 2005, Karcher was fired.  His final coaching record at Liberty was 21–46, with a 6–8 record in conference play (including two straight second places finishes). As of 2020, Karcher's winning percentage of .313 remains the worst win–loss percentage in the program's history.

As a coach, Karcher stressed building character in his players through football. One such player was Samkon Gado, a reserve while playing at Liberty.  Karcher helped Gado get his foot in the door of an NFL team, and within the year Gado was the starting running back for the Green Bay Packers.

After his dismissal from Liberty, Karcher was the offensive coordinator at Fellowship Christian High School in Roswell, Georgia, where he led the Paladins to their first-ever winning season and a deep run in the Georgia state playoffs. He also served as the school's athletic director, and taught a 9th grade Bible class at Fellowship Christian School.

In 2008, Karcher accepted a position as the quarterbacks coach with the University of Toledo. He helped the Rockets in an upset win over the Michigan Wolverines, although the squad finished 3–8.

In January 2009, head coach Ron English hired Karcher as offensive coordinator and quarterbacks coach at Eastern Michigan University. The Eagles finished that year with a 0–12 record, and Karcher's offense ranked 116th out of 120 teams in total yards (3,340).  Since then, EMU has improved, posting a 2–10 record the following year and a 6–6 record in 2011. EMU regressed in 2012 and finished the year 2–10. After the season, in which the Eagles finished near the bottom of the conference offensive statistics, Karcher left the program.

Personal life
Karcher is married to the former Pauline Termini and they have four children, daughters Kelly and Katie, and sons Austin and Clay.

Head coaching record

College

References

External links
 East Central Community College profile
 Eastern Michigan profile

1963 births
Living people
American football quarterbacks
Denver Broncos players
National Football League replacement players
Eastern Michigan Eagles football coaches
Liberty Flames football coaches
North Texas Mean Green football coaches
Notre Dame Fighting Irish football players
Rhein Fire coaches
Toledo Rockets football coaches
Tulane Green Wave football players
Junior college football coaches in the United States
Players of American football from Pittsburgh
Coaches of American football from Pennsylvania